Estonia was represented by Koit Toome, with the song "Mere lapsed", at the 1998 Eurovision Song Contest which took place on 9 May in Birmingham. "Mere lapsed" was chosen as the Estonian entry at the national final, Eurolaul, on 24 January.

Before Eurovision

Eurolaul 1998 
The final was held at the studios of broadcaster ETV in Tallinn, hosted by Marko Reikop and Anu Välba. Ten songs took part with the winner being chosen by an "expert" international jury. Other participants included former Estonian representatives Janika Sillamaa and Ivo Linna, and the following year's Evelin Samuel. "Mere lapsed" was an unexpected winner and had never been ahead in the voting until the final juror's votes enabled it to snatch an unpredicted last minute victory.

At Eurovision 
Heading into the final of the contest, BBC reported that bookmakers ranked the entry joint 12th out of the 25 entries. On the night of the final Toome performed 23rd in the running order, following Norway and preceding Turkey. At the close of voting "Mere lapsed" had picked up 36 points, placing Estonia joint 12th (with Portugal) of the 25 entries. The 12 points from the Estonian televote were awarded to Sweden.

Voting

References 

1998
Countries in the Eurovision Song Contest 1998
Eurovision